Paktika is one of the 34 provinces of Afghanistan, located in the eastern part of the country. Forming part of the larger Loya Paktia region, Paktika has a population of about 789,000, mostly ethnic Pashtuns. The town of Sharana serves as the provincial capital, while the most populous city is Urgun.

In 2021, the Taliban gained control of the province during the 2021 Taliban offensive.

Geography

Paktika sits adjacent to the Durand Line border between Pakistan and Afghanistan. It is bordered by the Khost and Paktia provinces to the north. The western border is shared with the provinces of Ghazni and Zabul. The South Waziristan and North Waziristan agencies are to the east of Paktika, while Zhob District of the Balochistan province of Pakistan borders it  the southeast. The Shinkay Hills run through the center of Paktika; Toba Kakar Range runs along the border with Pakistan.  The Southern districts are intermittently irrigated and cultivated, the center and north are used primarily for rangeland. There are natural forests in Ziruk, Nika, Gayan, and Bermal districts 

Paktika, like many other areas of Afghanistan, has been severely deforested. This has been a cause of devastating floods in recent years. The province is mainly hilly and interspersed with seasonal river valleys. In the north, the terrain gains elevation and becomes more rugged. In the west, the Rowd-e Lurah River originates in the mountainous Omna District and flows southwest to the Ghazni Province, forming a shallow river valley that dominates the topography in the Khairkot, Jani Khel, and Dila Districts. The terrain in Omna becomes more hilly further east in proximity to Pakistan. The sparsely populated southern districts are also hilly, with descending elevation towards the south and west.

The Gomal River, which has a varied flow depending on season, runs from its origin in the mountains of the Sar Hawza District and flows south, before turning southeast to the Pakistani border, forming the broad river valley that defines the topography of the Gomal District, before flowing east through Pakistan and eventually running to the powerful Indus River.

History

Paktika is the southernmost part of a historical region known as Greater Paktia (Pashto: لویه پکتیا, Loya Paktia), that was once a unified province including Paktia, Khost and parts of Ghazni and Logar. The tribes that reside in this area were mentioned by the Greek historian Herodotus, who called them the "Pactyans" as early as the 1st millennium BCE.

In the 1970s, the provincial capital of the largely undeveloped and remote province of Paktika was moved from the town of Urgun to Sharana due to its proximity with the main highway, connecting it to the larger cities and commercial centres of Kabul, Ghazni and Kandahar.

Paktika was the site of many battles during the Soviet occupation of the country and the lawless years that followed.

The Siege of Urgun took place between 1983 and 1984.

Recent history
As one of the most remote provinces in Afghanistan and an area that saw much devastation in previous years, Paktika suffers from a severe lack of critical infrastructure.  Reconstruction in the province after the fall of the Taliban has been slow compared to that in nearby provinces such as Khost and Zabul. This is primarily due to the remoteness of the region and repeated attacks on aid workers and NATO forces.

In June 2004, members of the Utah and Iowa National Guard helped Army Reserve Civil Affairs Soldiers from Oregon establish a Provincial Reconstruction Team base in Sharana, the provincial capital, to lead the development effort. The first full contingent of eight Civil Affairs Soldiers from the U.S. Army Reserve's 450th Civil Affairs Battalion (Airborne), based in Riverdale Park, Maryland, arrived in September 2004.

The Shkin firebase was composed of special operations forces. In an article from Time, the U.S. base was described as:

"The U.S. firebase looks like a Wild West cavalry fort, ringed with coils of razor wire. A U.S. flag ripples above the 3-ft.-thick mud walls, and in the watchtower a guard scans the expanse of forested ridges, rising to 9,000 ft., that mark the border. When there's trouble, it usually comes from that direction."

While the province hasn't witnessed the outright fighting in the last few years that has affected provinces like Helmand, there is a constant low level of tribal violence, accompanied by criminal and Taliban activity.  The last serious fighting in the province took place in 2004, amid reports that then-Governor Muhammad Ali Jalali was collaborating with Taliban forces, and that the Taliban had effectively annexed eastern portions of the province.  Jalali and many of his allied officials, were replaced and U.S. Special Forces were dispatched to fight the Taliban while the Pakistani forces fought with the Taliban's allies in neighbouring South Waziristan.

On 1 November 2004, a civil affairs convoy was ambushed near Surobi, between the Shkin firebase and Orgun-E. U.S. Army Spc. James Kearney, a turret gunner, died of a head shot from a sniper, which initiated the ambush.  Two vehicles were destroyed in the engagement and three other Soldiers were wounded.  The Provincial Reconstruction Team base was named Camp Kearney on 21 November 2004 to honor the sacrifice of Spc. James Kearney.

On Jun 18, 2008 in the Ziruk District Governor's compound, two members of the Provincial Reconstruction Team, HMN Mark Retmier and CM1 Ross Toles, were killed due to rocket attacks. The mess hall on Forward Operating Base Sharana was named after CM1 Toles and the hospital was named after HMN Retmier.

Kearney Base became the nucleus of what is now Forward Operating Base Sharana.

On July 4, 2009, combat outpost Zerok in East Paktika Province was attacked. The Haqqani network insurgents attacked the COP using mortars, accurate heavy machine gun fire, RPG fire, recoils rifles, and a 5000 lbs Jingle Truck VBIED that destroyed the outposts radio communication. The accurate enemy indirect fire from their mortars set the US mortar pit on fire, and killed two Able Company, 3rd Battalion 509th parachute Infantry regiment mortarmen, PFC Casillas and PFC Fairbairn. They were both returning fire on the 120mm mortar. After the VBIED went off, multiple insurgents began maneuvering towards the outpost, some getting within 100 meters of the cop. Because the enemy was advancing so close to the outpost, the request for CAS was called in, but because of the DUSTWUN (large scale search) for PFC Bergdahl, (who went AWOL after abandoning his post only 100 km away from COP Zerok), air support was delayed. After intense fighting the US Paratroopers suppressed and killed most of the enemy, eventually gunships arrived and JDAMs were dropped on enemy targets.

In 2010 the 101st Rakkasan air assault took over COP Zerok. 60 minutes produced a TV special documenting the unit's takeover of the COP, entitled COP Zerok.

In late July 2011, foreign troops and Afghan special forces killed more than 50 insurgents during an operation in eastern Paktika to clear a training camp the Haqqani network used for foreign fighters, NATO said.  Disenfranchised insurgents told security forces where the camp was located, the coalition said.

In November 2011, an estimated 60 to 70 Taliban insurgents were killed in an abortive attack on a joint Afghan-ISAF base in the Margha area of Barmal. No international troops were killed or injured in the incident. It is believed the insurgents crossed over from neighboring FATA and Balochistan of Pakistan. In a separate incident the governor of Sar Hawza district died in the same month after his vehicle struck a roadside bomb.

In the spring of 2012 the 172nd Infantry Brigade opened the first Afghan National Army/ US Joint Artillery Fire Base in the Orgun District.

In early 2013 10th Mountain Division, 2–14th Infantry, Golden Dragons, took over FOB Zerok.

Eight civilians including a pregnant woman and a baby died when Polish soldiers shelled the village of Nangar Khel, where a wedding celebration was taking place. Seven Polish soldiers have been charged with war crimes for allegedly opening fire in revenge.

U.S. Army PFC Bowe Bergdahl turned himself in to the Taliban on July 4, 2009, somewhere between OP Mest, near the town of Yahya Khel, and FOB Sharana. He was freed in a prisoner trade on May 31, 2014.

Paktika was one of the provinces most affected by the 2022 Afghanistan earthquake on 22 June 2022. In Gayan District, approximately 1,800 homes, or 70 percent of the district's homes, were destroyed, and 238 people were killed, with 393 others injured. In Barmal District, at least 500 people died, with a thousand others injured. Many houses constructed primarily of mud and wood were razed to the ground. Heavy rain and the earthquake contributed to landslides that destroyed entire hamlets. The local clinic in Gayan, which had the capacity of only five patients, was also heavily damaged. Of the about 500 patients admitted to the clinic due to the earthquake, about 200 died. Three days later, an aftershock killed five persons and wounded 11 more in Gayan District.

Transportation
As of May 2014, Paktika Province had regularly scheduled passenger flights to Kabul from Sharana Airstrip. The province's development is considered "backwards" compared to the rest of the country but Engineer Hafizullah, head of provincial public works department claimed in 2013 that in the past few years, 154-kilometers roads had been constructed with 70 km having been constructed in 2013 alone.

Demographics

As of 2021, the total population of the province is about 789,000, which is a multi-ethnic tribal society. According to the Naval Postgraduate School, the ethnic groups of the province are as follows: Pashtun, Tajik, Arab, Pashai, and other various minority groups. Other sources mention that ethnic Pashtuns make up around 96% of Paktika's population. Around 15,000 people (1.8%) are ethnic Uzbeks; and about 5,000 people speak some other languages. These are most probably Hazaras or Baloch. There is also a small Tajik community in Urgun.

The overwhelming majority of Paktika's population (around 99%) live in rural districts. The capital city, Sharana, has around 54,400 inhabitants. The majority of Pakikta's Districts have between 25,000 and 55,000 inhabitants. Only two districts, Nika and Turwo have less than 20,000 inhabitants, with a little more than 15,000 apiece. Two of the least mountainous districts, Urgun and neighboring Barmal have nearly 90,000 inhabitants each. There are around 115,000 households, with eight members apiece, in the Province.

Most of the Population is Sunni Muslim, and belongs to the Hanafi School.

Some tribes in Paktika may be pastoral.

Tribes

In Afghanistan the Ghilji are scattered all over the country but mainly settled around the regions between Zabul and Kabul provinces. The Afghan province of Paktika is considered to be a heartland of the Ghilji tribe. Ghilji sub-tribes in Paktika include the Kharoti, especially in the Sar Hawza and Urgon districts, the Andar and the largest single Ghilji sub-tribe, the Sulaimankhel, who are the majority in northern and western areas of Paktika such as; Katawaz. After the great Ghilji rebellion in 1885–1886, led by Alam Khan Nasher, many members of the Ghilji tribe, such as; the Kharoti sub-tribe and particularly the Nasher clan were exiled from Loya Paktia (Paktia, Paktika and Khost) to Kunduz in the north by Amir Abdur Rahman Khan due to political reasons. They are predominantly a nomadic group unlike the Durranis who are usually found in permanent settlements. The Ghilji mostly work as herdsmen as well as construction workers and in other jobs that allow them to travel. Often possessing great mechanical aptitude, the Ghilji nonetheless have an extremely low literacy rate hovering below 10% in Afghanistan. The Ghilji regularly cross over between Afghanistan and Pakistan often being exempted from customs due to the acceptance of their nomadic traditions by officials from both countries. Population estimates vary, but they are most likely around 20% to 25% of the population of Afghanistan and probably number over 9 million in Afghanistan alone with 4 million or more found in 
The main Pashtun tribes that live in Paktika are:
Ghilji (Bettani)
Ibrahimzai
Alizai
Sulaimanzai
Jalalzai
Alikhel
Boran
Suleimankhel
TanoKhel
Toran
Katawazy
Kharoti
Andar
Karlanri
Zadran (Gayan Khel Clan)
Wazir
Mahsud (Menzai Clan)

The Sulaimankhel are one of the largest sub-tribes of the Ghilji Pashtuns. The Sulaimankhel tribe is mainly located in the southern and eastern portions of Afghanistan; however, they also have a strong presence in the northern and western portions of Afghanistan.
The second largest Sulaimankhel population is located in Pakistan. Not only are they located in the province of Baluchistan and the North-West Frontier Province, but also located in Karachi and other parts of Pakistan.

The Kharoti and Sulaimankhel tribes are traditional rivals, although they co-exist together in several districts. The larger, influential and more powerful Sulaimankhel have historically had the upper hand in this rivalry. The Wazir and Kharoti are sometimes involved in a land dispute in Barmal District.

Districts

See also
 Provinces of Afghanistan

References

External links

 Tribal Map of Paktika on nps.edu

 
Provinces of Afghanistan
Provinces of the Islamic Republic of Afghanistan